The Democratic Party was a political party in the Gambia. The party was founded during the pre-independence period in the colony of Bathurst (currently the national capital Banjul). Ahead of the 1962 general elections, the DP merged with the Muslim Congress Party to form the Democratic Congress Alliance. In 1960, Alieu Ebrima Cham Joof who has been one of the original members was elected at its Social Secretary.

References 

Defunct political parties in the Gambia
The Gambia Democratic Party politicians